Henry Thornton (born 16 December 1996) is an Australian cricketer. He made his List A debut for Cricket Australia XI against Pakistanis during their tour of Australia on 10 January 2017.

Domestic career
Thornton made his Twenty20 debut playing for the Sydney Sixers in the 2016–17 Big Bash League against the Brisbane Heat on 3 January 2017. He opened the bowling and bowled his full four overs with figures of 1/40. Though it was the only BBL match he played for the season, he made his List A debut a week later playing for Cricket Australia XI in a tour match against Pakistan. He bowled 10 overs, including a maiden, and had figures of 3/69. Later in the season Thornton played a Twenty20 tour match against Sri Lanka, this time playing for the invitational team Prime Minister's XI. He bowled 2.1 overs with figures of 0/24.

Thornton was included in the Cricket Australia XI squad for the 2017–18 JLT One-Day Cup. He played three matches during the tournament, bowling at an economy rate of 5.64, but he was only able to take two wickets.

Four years after his Big Bash debut, Thornton played his second match in the competition, appearing for Adelaide Strikers in a 2021–22 match against Brisbane Heat. He took one wicket for the cost of 12 runs in three overs, generating some "eye-catching late movement" during the match.

In December 2022, Thornton took 5/3 to help bowl the Sydney Thunder out for 15, the lowest score in a professional T20 match.

References

External links
 

1996 births
Living people
Australian cricketers
Cricket Australia XI cricketers
Cricketers from Sydney
Sydney Sixers cricketers
Adelaide Strikers cricketers